Iulia Vasilica Curea (née Puşcaşu; born 8 April 1982, in Bacău) is a Romanian female handballer who played for the Romania national team. She is currently assistant manager of CSM București.

She was given the award of Cetățean de onoare ("Honorary Citizen") of the city of Bucharest in 2016.

International honours 
EHF Champions League:
Winner: 2016
Silver Medalist: 2010
Bronze Medalist: 2017, 2018
EHF Champions Trophy:
Winner: 2007
EHF Cup Winners' Cup:
Winner: 2007

Individual awards  
 Prosport Best Left Wing of the Romanian Liga Națională: 2018

References 

1982 births
Living people
Sportspeople from Bacău
Romanian female handball players
SCM Râmnicu Vâlcea (handball) players